George Ludlow may refer to:

George Ludlow, 3rd Earl Ludlow (1758–1842), British soldier
George C. Ludlow (1830–1900), American politician
George Duncan Ludlow (1734–1808), lawyer and judge